Secret Cargo (French: Cargaison clandestine) is a 1947 French drama film directed by Alfred Rode and starring Luis Mariano, Käthe von Nagy and Claudine Dupuis.

Cast
 Luis Mariano as José  
 Käthe von Nagy as Luisa Heim  
 Claudine Dupuis as Mila  
 Jean-Jacques Delbo as Carlos Mendoza  
 Junie Astor as Mme Mendoza  
 Pierre Renoir as Le préfet de police 
 Alfred Rode as Ricardo Mendi 
 Paul Amiot as Le gouverneur  
 Michel Ardan
 Lucas Gridoux as N'Goué, le restaurateur chinois  
 Jacqueline Ricard 
 J.J. Telbos 
 Jean Témerson

References

Bibliography 
 Hans-Michael Bock and Tim Bergfelder. The Concise Cinegraph: An Encyclopedia of German Cinema. Berghahn Books.

External links 
 

1947 films
French drama films
1947 drama films
1940s French-language films
Films directed by Alfred Rode
French black-and-white films
1940s French films